Saint Felicity may refer to:

Felicity of Rome (c. 101 - 165), saint numbered among the Christian martyrs
Perpetua and Felicity, martyred at Carthage